Brynjar Níelsson (born 1 September 1960) is an Icelandic politician who was a member of the Althing (Iceland's parliament) for the Reykjavík North constituency from 2013 to 2016 and the Reykjavík South constituency from 2016 to 2021, representing for the Independence Party.

References

External links 
Biography of Brynjar Níelsson on the parliament website (Icelandic)

Living people
1960 births
21st-century Icelandic politicians
Brynjar Nielsson
Brynjar Nielsson
Brynjar Nielsson
Brynjar Nielsson
Brynjar Nielsson
21st-century Icelandic lawyers